The HKL Class M200 is a class of metro trains in use on the Helsinki Metro, based on the DBAG Class 481 trains used on the Berlin S-Bahn. One train consists of two individually numbered cars. A total of 12 pairs (24 cars) were manufactured by Bombardier-DWA in Germany (with the electrical power drive systems manufactured by Alstom in France) during 2000–2001.

In 2017, the City Council of Helsinki decided to refurbish class M100 and class M200 trains in order to extend their lifetime for another 10 years. The renovation started in late 2019 and will be completed by government-owned VR FleetCare.

Up to six pairs can be combined into a 12-car train formation, however due to the relatively short length of the platforms (especially on the new Länsimetro extension), at most only two pairs (giving a 4-car formation per train; and prior to the Länsimetro opening in 2017 three pairs resulting in 6-car formations could also be seen during rush hour) can be combined for passenger service. Longer combinations are used in maintenance operations. Any Helsinki metro train types can be combined mechanically, such as for towing.

See also 

 Helsinki Metro
 Helsinki City Transport
 HKL Class M100
 HKL Class M300

References

External links 
 

Helsinki Metro
Multiple units of Finland
Valmet
750 V DC multiple units
Alstom multiple units
Bombardier Transportation multiple units